"Girl Next Door" is a song by American pop rock band Saving Jane, released as the first single from the band's second studio album of the same name (2005) on August 15, 2005. The song was a top-40 success on several US Billboard charts, peaking at number 31 on the Hot 100.

Content
"Girl Next Door" expresses the jealousy of an unpopular high school student towards another student's success as a cheerleader and beauty queen.

Music video
A music video for "Girl Next Door" was released in February 2006. It was recorded over one weekend in Los Angeles despite harsh weather; a spokesperson of Saving Jane's label said the video used the rain effectively, and that it had stopped before the filming of important scenes. The video featured on MTV's Total Request Live.

It stars two girls, one jealous of the other. When the second chorus kicks in, the girl uses her powers to hit the jealous one. They both appear in separate scenes, thanks to a pink double-screen. The lead singer is performing in a classroom, and with her band at a concert. The video ends with the girls in two limos. The jealous one somehow cuts into the other girl's screen, and steals a tiara from her. She tries to get it back, but bangs her head on the side of her screen instead.

Other versions
A version of "Girl Next Door" was featured in the 2006 video game expansion The Sims 2: Pets, written in the fictional language Simlish. Country singer Julie Roberts recorded a version of the song for her 2006 studio album Men & Mascara after the lead single failed to chart. A Kidz Bop version was released in 2006.

Track listings
US promo CD
 "Girl Next Door" (radio edit) – 3:25
 "Girl Next Door" (alt. version) – 3:17

Canadian CD EP
 "Girl Next Door" (radio edit) – 3:28
 "Girl Next Door" (original mix) – 3:15
 "Girl Next Door" (AAA mix) – 3:10

Charts

References

2005 debut singles
2006 singles
Julie Roberts songs
Saving Jane songs
2005 songs